Alaqayah (also romanized as Ālāqayah) is a village in Nazarkahrizi Rural District, Nazarkahrizi District, Hashtrud County, East Azerbaijan Province, Iran. At the 2006 census, its population was 508, living in 116 families.

References 

Towns and villages in Hashtrud County